The word duct is derived from the Latin word for led/leading. It may refer to:

 Duct (anatomy), various ducts in anatomy and physiology
 Tear duct, which carry tears to the eyes
 Duct (HVAC), for transfer of air between spaces in a structure
 Duct tape, a kind of adhesive tape
 Ducted fan, motor for aircraft
 Electrical bus duct, a metal enclosure for busbars
 Duct (industrial exhaust), industrial exhaust duct system designed for low pressure-pneumatic convey of gas, fumes, dusts, shavings, and other pollutants from works space to atmosphere after cleaning and removal of contaminants
 Atmospheric duct, a horizontal layer in the lower atmosphere in which the vertical refractive index gradients are such that radio signals (a) are guided or ducted, (b) tend to follow the curvature of the Earth, and (c) experience less attenuation in the ducts than they would if the ducts were not present
 Tropospheric ducting, a type of radio propagation in the troposphere that allows signals to travel unusually long distances
 Earth–ionosphere waveguide, a type of atmospheric duct
 Surface duct, a sound propagation phenomenon at sea
 Duct bank, a set of electrical conduits or telecommunications conduits, entering a building underground
 Duct Publishing, an imprint of the German group VDM Publishing devoted to the reproduction of Wikipedia content
 Dispatchable Unit Control Table (DUCT) in z/Architecture
 Flexible Ducting

See also
 Ducked